Moderates, also known as Modern Liberals or Small-L Liberals, and Small-C Conservatives are members, supporters, or voters of the Liberal Party of Australia who are economically conservative, but progressive on social and environmental policies. They compete with the Liberal Party's other two factions: The National Right and the centre-right.

Geographical base
Moderate Liberals often represent inner city and wealthy House of Representatives seats or are in the Senate. The Moderates are noted as having very little presence in the state of Queensland and Western Australia, while in Victoria the nominal Moderate faction is not affiliated with those of the other states.

Membership
Prominent moderates include former Prime Minister Malcolm Turnbull, former Foreign Affairs Minister and former Deputy Leader Julie Bishop, former Defence Minister and former Deputy Leader Christopher Pyne, former Attorney-General George Brandis, and former Liberal-turned-independent MP Julia Banks.

Prominent moderates in the Morrison Government included Senate leader Simon Birmingham, Marise Payne, Paul Fletcher and Linda Reynolds.

Current federal members of the Moderates

Current members of the Victorian Moderates

Victorian Membership

Former federal parliamentary members of the Moderates

See also 
 Teal independents
 National Right
 One Nation Conservatives
 Blue Grit
 Red Tory
 Blue Dog Coalition
 New Democrat Coalition
 Republican Governance Group
 Labor Right
 Labor Left

References 

Liberal Party of Australia factions
Centrism in Australia
Liberalism in Australia
Progressive conservatism